Chicomurex venustulus, common name the charming murex, is a species of sea snail, a marine gastropod mollusk in the family Muricidae, the murex snails or rock snails.

Description
The size of an adult shell varies between 40 mm and 72 mm.

Distribution
This species occurs in the Indian Ocean along Réunion, in the Pacific Ocean along the Marquesas Islands and the Philippines, and in the South China Sea along Vietnam.

References

 Rehder, H.A. & Wilson, B. R., 1975. New species of marine mollusks from Pitcairn Island and the Marquesas. Smithsonian Contributions to Zoology 203: 1-16
 Merle D., Garrigues B. & Pointier J.-P. (2011) Fossil and Recent Muricidae of the world. Part Muricinae. Hackenheim: Conchbooks. 648 pp. page(s): 110

External links
 

Muricidae
Gastropods described in 1975